Beautiful Swimmers: Watermen, Crabs and the Chesapeake Bay (1976) is a non-fiction book by William W. Warner about the Chesapeake Bay, blue crabs and watermen. The book takes its name from the generic name of the blue crab, Callinectes, which is Greek for "beautiful swimmer." It won the 1977 Pulitzer Prize for non-fiction.

References

William W. Warner. Beautiful Swimmers. The Atlantic Monthly Press and Little, Brown Books. 1976.

External links
 

1976 non-fiction books
Works about Chesapeake Bay
Pulitzer Prize for General Non-Fiction-winning works